Shuangjiang Lahu, Va, Blang and Dai Autonomous County is a county in the southwest of Yunnan province, China. It is under the administration of the prefecture-level city of Lincang.

Administrative divisions
Shuangjiang Lahu, Va, Bulang and Dai Autonomous County has 2 towns and 4 townships. 
2 towns
 Mengmeng
 Mengku
4 townships

Ethnic groups
Ethnic Wa (population: 11,613) are concentrated in the west and south of Shuangjiang County, especially in the following two villages (Shuangjiang County Gazetteer).
Man'e 勐峨, Shahe Township 沙河乡
Nanxie 南协, Bangbing Township 邦丙乡

Transportation
China National Highway 214

Climate

References

External links
Shuangjiang County Official Site

County-level divisions of Lincang
Lahu autonomous counties
Wa autonomous counties
Blang people
Dai autonomous counties
Autonomous counties of the People's Republic of China